The Bible Companion (or Bible Reading Planner) is a guide developed by the Christadelphians to aid reading the Bible. It was first produced by Robert Roberts when he was 14 years of age, in about 1853, and revised by him over a number of years into its current format.

Background
Christadelphians believe that reading the Bible is very important: they believe that it is "essential if one is to discover—and remember—God's revelation of Himself and His purpose"; citing Bible verses such as Psalm 119:105, they believe the Bible gives moral direction for the life of a Christian - thus the Bible Companion is designed to aid the Christian in their Bible reading to this end.

The Bible Companion as a reading aid
By following the Bible Companion the reader is led, in small portions, through the whole Bible in a year. The Old Testament is read once in the year, and the New Testament is read twice. The plan starts on January 1 in the Book of Genesis, Book of Psalms and Book of Matthew and works its way through the scriptures as the year goes along providing around four chapters per day. Here is an example of a section from the Bible Companion:

Current usage
Although the Bible Companion was developed over 100 years ago by the Christadelphians it is still widely used within the community. Some ecclesias (individual churches) read the allotted chapters of the Bible as found in the companion during their Sunday services. Many people have the Bible Companion printed on book marks so they can easily find and follow the day's readings. There is an increasing number of apps for mobile phones and tablets which also show the daily readings. Use of the Bible Companion is down to the individual's choice.

References

External links

Bible Companions
Daily Bible readings based on the "Bible Companion" but with added brief reading from Proverbs each day
A Bible Study site based on the Bible Companion which incorporates the Daily Readings.

Comments, exhortations and questions following the Bible Companion program
Daily Bible readings following the Companion with comments on each reading
Daily Bible Reading Exhortations following the Bible Companion
Christadelphian Isolation League publishes exhortations every week, and the website,  alongside the readings from the KJV and as audio files, has Exhortations published on each day in recent years that may link to the daily readings

Christadelphian books
Books about the Bible
1853 books
1853 in Christianity